The 2019 NAB AFL Women's Rising Star award was presented to the player adjudged the best young player during the 2019 AFL Women's season. Madison Prespakis of the Carlton Football Club won the award with 49 votes.

Eligibility
Every round, two nominations were given to standout young players who performed well during that particular round. To be eligible for nomination, players must have been under 21 years of age on 1 January 2019, not have been suspended during the season and never previously been nominated.

Nominations

Final voting

References

2019 AFL Women's season